The following is a list of notable Turkish Americans, including both original immigrants of full or partial Turkish descent who obtained American citizenship and their American descendants. 

Most notable Turkish Americans have come from, or originate from, Turkey but there are also notable Americans of Turkish origin who have immigrated from, or descend from, the other former Ottoman territories, especially Turks from the Balkans, the island of Cyprus (e.g. Erden Eruç, Halil Güven, Hal Ozsan, Abdul Kerim al-Qubrusi, and Vamık Volkan, are of Turkish Cypriot origin), North Africa (e.g. Leila Ahmed and Nonie Darwish are of Turkish-Egyptian origin, and Mustapha Osman was of Turkish-Tunisian origin), and the Levant (e.g. Etel Adnan is of Turkish-Syrian origin; David Chokachi and Salih Neftçi are of Turkish-Iraqi origin; Nabila Khashoggi is from the Khashoggi family who are of Turkish origin). 

Some Turkish Americans have also come to the US from areas where there is a modern Turkish diaspora; for example, Turhan Bey had a Turkish-Austrian background; Timothy Guy Kent has a Turkish Canadian background; Marie Tepe had a Turkish-French background; Ergun Caner has a Turkish-Swedish background; Kasim Edebali has a Turkish-German background; and Didem Erol has a Turkish Australian background.

Academia

 Sibel Adalı, Professor of Computer Science at Rensselaer Polytechnic Institute
 Leila Ahmed, Professor of Women's Studies in Religion at Harvard Divinity School
 Esra Akcan,  Professor of Architecture at Cornell University
 Mustafa Aksakal, professor of history at Georgetown University 
 İlhan Aksay, Professor in Engineering and Emeritus Professor of Chemical and Biological Engineering at Princeton University
 Ali Akansu,  electrical engineer and scientist
 Asuman Aksoy, Professor of Mathematics at Claremont McKenna College
 Serap Aksoy,
 Ian F. Akyildiz, Chair Professor in Telecommunications
 Ilkay Altintas, Chief data science officer at the University of California
 Ali Argon,  Professor Emeritus at the Massachusetts Institute of Technology
 Muzaffer Atac, Professor of Physics 
 Bülent Atalay,  Professor of physics at the University of Mary Washington and the University of Virginia
 Esin Atıl, historian of Islamic art and curator of Islamic art at the Freer Gallery of Art
 Ozlem Ayduk, social psychologist at U.C. Berkeley 
 Özalp Babaoğlu, Professor of computer science at University of Bologna
 Ivet Bahar, Professor of Computational Biology at University of Pittsburgh
 A. Baha Balantekin, Professor of Physics at the University of Wisconsin
 Asım Orhan Barut, Professor of physics at the University of Colorado at Boulder
 Itzhak Bars, theoretical physicist at the University of Southern California in Los Angeles
 Tamer Başar, Professor at University of Illinois at Urbana-Champaign
 Elif Batuman, academic and journalist
 Nihat Berker, scientist, theoretical chemist, physicist and emeritus professor of physics at MIT
 Burcin Becerik-Gerber,  Professor of Civil and Environmental Engineering at the University of Southern California
 Soner Cagaptay, director of the Turkish Research Program at the Washington Institute for Near East Policy
 Gunduz Caginalp, Professor of Mathematics at University of Pittsburgh 
 Ergun Caner, Professor of Theology and Church History
 Zeynep Çelik-Butler, Professor of Electrical Engineering at the University of Texas at Arlington. 
 Mine Çetinkaya-Rundel, Associate professor of the practice in statistics at Duke University
 Erhan Çinlar,  Professor Emeritus at Princeton University
 Canan Dağdeviren, assistant professor at the Massachusetts Institute of Technology (MIT)
 Utkan Demirci, Professor at Stanford University School of Medicine
 Arif Dirlik, Professor at the University of British Columbia 
 Servet A. Duran,  Professor of Materials Science at Washington State University 
 Ali Erdemir, Professor of Mechanical Engineering at Texas A&M University
 Taner Edis, Professor of physics at the Truman State University
 Ahmed Cemal Eringen, Professor of continuum mechanics at Princeton University 
 Fazıl Erdoğan, Professor and Dean of Mechanical Engineering and Mechanics at Lehigh University
 Alev Erisir, Professor of Psychology and the Department Chair at the University of Virginia
 Elza Erkip, Professor and wireless technology researcher at New York University
 Merve Emre, Associate professor of American literature at Oxford University 
 Okan Ersoy,  Professor of electrical engineering and Director of Statistical and Computational Intelligence Laboratory at Purdue University
 Erdağ Göknar, Associate Professor of Turkish and Middle Eastern Studies at Duke University 
 Selda Gunsel, Vice President (VP) for Global Commercial Technology at Royal Dutch Shell
 Murat Günel, Professor of Neurosurgery at Yale University
 Faruk Gül, Professor of Economics, Princeton University
 Feza Gürsey, mathematician and physicist
 Suha Gürsey, physicist and mathematician 
 Halil Güven, Dean of San Diego State University - Georgia
 M. Şükrü Hanioğlu, Professor of Near Eastern Studies, Princeton University
 Çiğdem Balım Harding, Senior lecturer at Indiana University
 Peter Harzem, Professor of Psychology at Auburn University
 Ali Hortaçsu, Professor of Economics at the University of Chicago
 Gökhan S. Hotamisligil, Professor of Nutrition & Division of Biological Sciences at Harvard University
 Alp Ikizler, nephrologist, holder of the Catherine McLaughlin Hakim chair in Medicine at Vanderbilt University School of Medicine
 Ataç İmamoğlu, physicist
 Umran Inan, scientist at Koç University and Stanford University 
 Murat Iyigun, Professor of Economics at the University of Colorado
 Cemal Kafadar, Professor of Turkish Studies at Harvard University
 Pinar Karaca-Mandic, Professor of Healthcare Risk Management at the University of Minnesota
 Merve Kavakçı, George Washington University Professor and former Fazilet Party Parliamentarian 
 Pınar Keskinocak, Professor of Industrial and Systems Engineering at Georgia Institute of Technology
 Timur Kuran, Professor of Economics and Political Science, and Gorter Family Professor in Islamic Studies at Duke University
 Yahya M. Madra, Associate Professor of Economics at Drew University
 Naci Mocan, Ourso Distinguished Chair of Economics at Louisiana State University
 Gülru Necipoğlu, Professor and Director of the Aga Khan Program for Islamic Architecture at Harvard University
 Salih Neftçi, Professor of Economics at the New School University (Turkish-Iraqi origin)
 Banu Onaral, Professor of Biomedical Engineering and Electrical Engineering at Drexel University
 Özalp Özer,  Professor of Management Science at the University of Texas at Dallas 
 Mihri Özkan, Professor of Electrical and Computer Engineering at University of California, Berkeley
 Meral Özsoyoglu, Professor Emeritus of Computer Science at Case Western Reserve University
Asuman Özdağlar, professor at the Massachusetts Institute of Technology (MIT)
 Burçin Mutlu-Pakdil, astronomer and astrophysicist at the University of Arizona
 Dani Rodrik, professor of International Political Economy at the John F. Kennedy School of Government at Harvard University
 Sema Salur,  Professor of Mathematics at the University of Rochester
 Aziz Sancar, Professor of Biochemistry and Biophysics at the University of North Carolina School of Medicine
 Ezel Kural Shaw, historian and wife of Stanford J. Shaw
 Muzafer Sherif, Professor of Sociology at Pennsylvania State University
 Eshref Shevky, Professor of Sociology at the University of California
 Oktay Sinanoğlu, youngest full Professor in Yale's 20th-century history
 Emin Gün Sirer, Associate Professor of Computer Science at Cornell University
 Halil Mete Soner, Professor of Financial Mathematics at ETH Zürich
 Tayfun Sönmez, Professor of Economics at Boston College
 Ayşe Şahin, chair of the Department of Mathematics and Statistics at Wright State University
 Damla Şentürk, Professor of biostatistics in the University of California
 Serap Z. Tilav, US Antarctic Program field team member; the Tilav Cirque is named after her  
 Mehmet Toner, Professor of surgery at the Harvard Medical School and Professor of biomedical engineering at the Harvard-MIT Division of Health Sciences and Technology
 Sefaattin Tongay,  Professor of Materials Science and Engineering at Arizona State University 
 Zeynep Tufekci,  Associate professor of Sociology at the University of North Carolina
 Galip Ulsoy, Professor Emeritus of Mechanical Engineering and W.C. Ford Professor Emeritus of Manufacturing at University of Michigan 
 Turgay Üzer, Professor Emeritus at Georgia Institute of Technology
 Vamık Volkan, Emeritus Professor of Psychiatry at the University of Virginia,
 Nur Yalman, Professor of Social Anthropology and Middle Eastern Studies at Harvard University 
 Osman Yaşar, Professor and chair of the computational science department at State University of New York College at Brockport
 K. Aslıhan Yener, University of Chicago archaeologist who uncovered a new source of Bronze Age Anatolian tin mines
Aylin Yener, holds the Roy and Lois Chope Chair in engineering at Ohio State University
 Ahmet Yıldız, Associate Professor of Physics and Molecular Cell Biology at the University of California 
 Bilge Yildiz,Professor of Nuclear Science, Materials Science and Engineering at the Massachusetts Institute of Technology
 Pınar Yoldaş, architect, artist and Professor at University of California San Diego

Activism
 Nonie Darwish, founder of Arabs for Israel 
 Furkan Doğan student, known for being killed in the Gaza flotilla raid

American Civil War

 Marie Tepe, vivandière who fought for the Union army

Architecture and design
 Kalef Alaton, interior designer
 Kaya Arıkoğlu, urban designer

Arts and literature 

 Etel Adnan, poet and visual artist
 Haluk Akakçe, artist
 Refik Anadol, media artist 
 Kutluğ Ataman, contemporary artist and filmmaker 
 Alev Croutier, writer
 Sevgi Çağal, painter and sculpture
 Adam Darius, dancer, mime artist, writer and choreographer
 Burhan Doğançay, painter, photographer, and former soccer player
 Ipek Duben, contemporary visual artist 
 Bilge Ebiri, New York Magazine film critic
 Rana Foroohar, business columnist and an associate editor at the Financial Times
 Sururi Gümen, Illustrator and ghost artist behind Alfred Andriola's comic strip Kerry Drake
 Ben Ali Haggin,  portrait painter and stage designer
 Timothy Guy Kent, artist 
 Jarett Kobek, author of the 2016 novel I Hate the Internet
 Reha Kutlu-Hutin, journalist, animal rights activist, and President of 30 millions d'amis
 Shevaun Mizrahi, filmmaker
 Mustapha Osman, caricaturist, model maker and set designer 
 Serkan Özkaya, conceptual artist 
 Hayal Pozanti, artist
 Gizem Saka, contemporary artist
 Ali Sar, journalist 
 Ozge Samanci, artist and Professor at Northwestern University
 Hakan Topal, artist and founder of Xurban collective
 Özel Türkbaş, belly dancer 
 Ayse Wilson, artist 
 Jihan Zencirli, visual artist

Astronomy 
 Betul Kacar
 Janet Akyüz Mattei, astronomer and director of the AAVSO
 Feryal Özel, astrophysicist

Business 

 Melih Abdulhayoğlu, billionaire; founder, CEO, and president of Comodo Group
 Tevfik Arif, founder of the Bayrock Group
 Yalcin Ayasli, business executive 
 Ali Aydar, CEO of Sporcle
 Süreyya Ciliv, former CEO of Turkcell
 Hikmet Ersek, CEO of Western Union
 James Ben Ali Haggin, investor and founder of the Ben Ali Stakes
 Osman Kibar, billionaire; founder and CEO of Samumed 
 Yalman Onaran, financial journalist
 Eren Ozmen, billionaire; co-owner and president of Sierra Nevada Corporation 
 Fatih Ozmen, billionaire; co-owner of Sierra Nevada Corporation
 Cemil Ozyurt, founder of  U.S.-based Turk of America
 Hasan Piker, Twitch streamer and political commentator
 Muhtar Kent, former CEO and chairman of The Coca-Cola Company
 Nabila Khashoggi, businesswoman 
 Murat Köprülü, investment professional and chairman of the American Turkish Society, and founder and chairman of the American Immigrant Society
 Richard Lounsbery, businessman and founder of the Richard Lounsbery Foundation 
 Erol Onaran, founder of Erol's
 Ahmet Mücahid Ören, CEO of İhlas Holding
 Mike Sarimsakci, businessman
 Leila Steinberg, business woman and the first manager of rapper Tupac Shakur (Mexican-Turkish mother)
 Kenan Şahin, establishing partner in Lucent Technologies

Cinema and television

 Derya Arbaş, actress
 Jack Bannon, actor 
 Aclan Bates, director 
 Bea Benaderet
 Turhan Bey, 1940s and 1950s film star
 D'Arcy Carden, actress 
 David Chokachi, actor
 Jason Davis, voice actor
 Bilge Ebiri, journalist and filmmaker
 Tarik Ergin, actor
 Didem Erol, actress
 Ayda Field, actress, married to British singer-songwriter Robbie Williams
 Defne Joy Foster, actress 
 Rowby Goren, comedy writer
 Murat Han, actor
 Nicholas Kadi, actor
 Kaan Kalyon, co-writer of Disney's Pocahontas (1995) and Hercules (1997) 
 Erin Kaplan, television and fashion media personality
 Erol Onaran, founder of Erol's TV, Erol's Video and Erol's Internet
 Eren Özker, puppeteer on The Muppet Show
 Daphne Oz, nutrition author and television host
 Hal Ozsan, actor 
 Irma St. Paule, actress
 Ayse Romey, actress
 Ozman Sirgood, actor 
 Emre Sahin, film and television director 
 Tiffani Thiessen, actress
 Louie Torrellas, actor and comedian 
 Onur Tukel, actor, painter, and filmmaker
 Lev Yilmaz, filmmaker
 Emrah Yucel, graphic artist for Hollywood movie posters

Early Turkish settlers to the US
Ibrahim Ben Ali, Ottoman Turkish soldier and physician who arrived in the US in the late 1790s

Fashion design and modelling

 John Gidding, fashion model
 Elle Fowler, beauty and style-related YouTuber
 Blair Fowler, beauty and style-related YouTuber
 Melissa Odabash, fashion designer
 Dee Ocleppo, fashion designer

House of Osman 
 Ertuğrul Osman, the 43rd Head of the Imperial House of Osman

Law 
 Halil Süleyman Özerden, United States District Judge for the Southern District of Mississippi

Medicine 

 Fikri Alican, surgeon and medical doctor 
 Münci Kalayoğlu, surgeon 
 Zeynel A. 
Karcıoğlu, M.D., ophthalmic oncology and orbital diseases specialist, surgeon
 Behram Kurşunoğlu, physicist, co-founder of the Center for Theoretical Studies, University of Miami
 H. Nida Sen, clinical investigator at the National Eye Institute
 Mehmet Öz, cardiothoracic surgeon and host of The Dr. Oz Show
 Dr. Hasan Özbekhan, Professor Emeritus at the Wharton School of the University of Pennsylvania, founding member and first director of the think tank The Club of Rome, systems scientist, cyberneticist, philosopher, and planner

Music

 Fahir Atakoğlu, pianist
 Bülent Arel, composer of contemporary classical music and electronic music
 Kathy Barr, singer
 Atilla Engin, fusion jazz drummer
 Ahmet Ertegün, founder of Atlantic Records, chairman of the Rock and Roll Hall of Fame and Museum, and co-founder of the New York Cosmos soccer team of the North American Soccer League
 Nesuhi Ertegün, record producer and executive of Atlantic Records
 Oak Felder, songwriter and record producer
 Selim Giray, violinist 
 Eydie Gormé, singer 
 Isaac Guillory, folk guitarist  
 Kamran İnce, composer
 Emir Işılay, composer and pianist
 Tolga Katas, singer, songwriter, and record producer
 Arif Mardin, Vice President and general manager of Manhattan Records
 Joe Mardin, music producer and son of Arif Mardin 
 İlhan Mimaroğlu,  musician and electronic music composer; founder of Finnadar Records 
 Mehmet Ali Sanlıkol,  Grammy nominated composer
 Neil Sedaka, pop singer, pianist, and songwriter
 Pamela Spence, pop-rock singer
 Deniz Tek, founding member of Australian rock group Radio Birdman
 Özlem Tekin, singer
 Ömer Faruk Tekbilek, Turkish musician and composer
 Pınar Toprak, composer

NASA 
 Ismail Akbay, served in various managerial capacities during NASA's Apollo, Skylab and Apollo–Soyuz projects 
 Serkan Golge, NASA contractor on NASA's proposed human mission to Mars
 Dilhan Eryurt
 Feryal Ozel

Politics 

Zeyno Baran, scholar on issues on US-Turkey relations
 Selin Sayek Böke,  member of the Republican People's Party (CHP) in Turkey
 Osman "Oz" Bengür, Maryland Democratic Party Congressional candidate
 Fetullah Gülen, leader of the Gülen Movement
 Boris Johnson, Prime Minister of the United Kingdom (American-born and great-grandson of Ali Kemal)
 Merve Kavakçı,  Turkish ambassador to Malaysia
Hasan Piker, Twitch streamer and political commentator
 Cenk Uygur, host of The Young Turks and candidate for California's 25th congressional district in 2020

Religion
 Abdul Kerim al-Qubrusi, former representative of the Naqshbandi-Haqqani Order in the United States
 Yusuf Ziya Kavakçı, Islamic cleric

Sports

 Ayla Aksu, tennis player
 Haydar Aşan, sprinter
 Chris Başak, Major League Baseball infielder
 Hilmi Esat Bayındırlı, Paralympic alpine skier
 Deniz Bozkurt, plays for the Puerto Rico national football team
 Kasim Edebali, American football player
 Korel Engin, basketball player
 Erden Eruç, completed first solo human-powered circumnavigation of the Earth by rowboat, sea kayak, bicycle and foot
 Tunç İlkin, former Pittsburgh Steelers player and sports commentator
 Ersan İlyasova, Milwaukee Bucks player
 Enes Kanter, basketball player
 Şebnem Kimyacıoğlu, basketball player
 Yasemin Kimyacıoğlu, basketball player
 Abdurrahim Kuzu, wrestler
 Mehmet Okur, Utah Jazz player and 2007 NBA All-Star
 Yılmaz Orhan, football player
 Alp Ozkilic, mixed martial artist
 Renan Ozturk, rock climber 
 Peri Suzan Özkum, diver
 William Haggin Perry, horseracer 
 Nevin Nevlin, basketball player
 Lisa Marie Varon, former professional wrestler known as Tara in TNA and Victoria in WWE
 Ugur Taner, swimmer 
 Ferdi Taygan, tennis player
 Cayman Togashi, football player in Japan
 Tansel Turgut,  chess player who earned the title of International Correspondence Chess Grandmaster in 2007
 Hidayet Türkoğlu, Orlando Magic player
 Jonny Vandal, professional wrestler 
 Nevriye Yılmaz,  basketball player
 Ömer Faruk Yurtseven, basketball player
 Rahim Zafer, manager of Dallas City FC

Other

 Zeyno Baran, Director of the Center for Eurasian Policy
 Orkut Büyükkökten, software engineer
 Tantek Çelik, computer scientist
 Brittanee Drexel, woman missing since 2009
 Sibel Deniz Edmonds, former FBI translator

See also 

List of Turkish people
List of British Turks
List of Turkish Germans
Azerbaijani-Americans
Turkish-Cypriot

References

External links 
 Turks in entertainment

Americans
 
Turkish
Turkish